Saint-Pons-la-Calm is a commune in the Gard department in southern France.

Geography
It is located near Bagnols-sur-Cèze, the third-largest city of Gard, a few minutes away from the Pont du Gard, from Uzès, Nîmes, Avignon, Alès, and the Cévennes. Saint-Pons benefits from being at the crossroads of the valleys of the Tave, the Cèze and the Rhône.

Population

See also
Communes of the Gard department

References

Communes of Gard